Franz Wenzler (26 April 1893 – 9 January 1942) was a German film director.

Selected filmography
 The Scoundrel (1931)
 The Night Without Pause (1931)
 Marriage with Limited Liability (1931)
 When Love Sets the Fashion (1932)
 The Importance of Being Earnest (1932)
 Scandal on Park Street (1932)
 The Peak Scaler (1933)
  (1935)

References

Bibliography
 Weniger, Kay. ‘Es wird im Leben dir mehr genommen als gegeben …’. Lexikon der aus Deutschland und Österreich emigrierten Filmschaffenden 1933 bis 1945. Eine Gesamtübersicht. ACABUS-Verlag, Hamburg 2011, p. 656
 Grange, William. Cultural Chronicle of the Weimar Republic. Scarecrow Press, 2008.

External links

1893 births
1942 deaths
Mass media people from Braunschweig
Film directors from Lower Saxony